Timandra Harkness is a British writer, presenter and comedian.

Education 
Harkness has a BA in Film and Drama with Art from Bulmershe College and a BSc in Mathematics & Statistics from the Open University, awarded in 2017.

Career 
Harkness has written about technology for BBC Science Focus magazine, about statistics for Significance (a popular science magazine published by the Royal Statistical Society), and about motorcycles for The Daily Telegraph. Her work for BBC Radio 4 includes an afternoon play, documentaries, being a roving reporter for The Human Zoo and presenting FutureProofing, a series about the future potential of science. She is the author of the book Big Data: Does Size Matter?

In 1999 Harkness co-wrote a comedy with her mother Linda Cotterill, called No Future in Eternity, about an astronomer who shares a flat with two angels.  They received a grant from the Astronomer Royal for Scotland, John Campbell Brown, to perform the show at the Edinburgh Festival Fringe in 2000.  The show was subsequently broadcast as an afternoon play on BBC Radio 4.

Since 2004 Harkness has collaborated with Dr Helen Pilcher, as a comedy duo named the Comedy Research Project, writing and performing stand-up shows about science.

In 2012 Harkness and fellow comedian Matt Parker co-wrote a comedy show called Your Days are Numbered: The Maths of Death.  They performed the show in Australia, at the Adelaide Fringe and Melbourne International Comedy Festival, on tour around England and in Scotland, at the Edinburgh Festival Fringe.

Harkness returned to the Edinburgh Festival Fringe in 2019 to perform a one-woman show, called Take a Risk.

Since 2016, Harkness has chaired the Data Debate for the Alan Turing Institute and the British Library, a series of panel discussions about big data and its implications for society.  She has spoken at the Hay Festival, the Battle of Ideas, TEDx, The Scotsman Data Conference and the Cheltenham Science Festival.

Harkness is a Fellow of the Royal Statistical Society, a founding member of their special interest group on Data Ethics and a visiting fellow at the University of Winchester's Centre for Information Rights.

Awards 
In 1997, Harkness won a column-writing competition, organised by The Independent newspaper.

Publications 

 Big Data: Does Size Matter (2016)

Radio 
 No Future In Eternity (2001)
 Data, Data, Everywhere (2014) 
 Personality Politics (2014)
 FutureProofing (2014–present)
 Hindsight Bias (2015)
 Perfect People (2015)
 Supersense Me (2017)
 The Why Factor: Are You A Numbers Person? (2017)
 How to Disagree: A Beginner's Guide to Having Better Arguments (2018)
 The Infinite Monkey Cage: Big Data (2018)
 Divided Nation (2019) 
 What Has Sat-Nav Done to Our Brains? (2019)
 Five Knots (2020)
 Steelmanning (2021)

Comedy 
 The Comedy Research Project (2004)
 Your Days Are Numbered - The Maths of Death (2012)
 Brainsex (2013)
 Take A Risk (2019)

References 

Living people
Data scientists
Women data scientists
English comedians
21st-century English comedians
English women comedians
English comedy writers
English radio presenters
Alumni of the Open University
Year of birth missing (living people)